The house at 30 Murray Street is a historic home located at Mount Morris in Livingston County, New York. It was built about 1890 and is a textbook example of the late 19th century interpretation of the Queen Anne style.  It features asymmetrical massing, decorative shingle siding, multi-gabled roof with tall corbelled brick chimneys, and a prominent corner tower.

It was listed on the National Register of Historic Places in 1999.

References

External links
House at No. 30 at Murray Street - Mount Morris, New York - U.S. National Register of Historic Places on Waymarking.com

Houses on the National Register of Historic Places in New York (state)
Queen Anne architecture in New York (state)
Houses completed in 1890
Houses in Livingston County, New York
National Register of Historic Places in Livingston County, New York